The Urupsky mine is a large copper mine located in the south-west of Russia in Karachay-Cherkessia. Urupsky represents one of the largest copper reserve in Russia and in the world having estimated reserves of 365.7 million tonnes of ore grading 1.51% copper.

See also 
 List of mines in Russia

References 

Copper mines in Russia